Jan van Aken (Herwen en Aerdt, August 9, 1961) is a Dutch writer, who worked in the cultural sector and in automation. He is currently a professor at the Schrijversvakschool in Amsterdam.

He has written the following historical novels:
 Het oog van de basilisk (2000)
 De valse dageraad (2001)
 De dwaas van Palmyra (2003)
 Het fluwelen labyrint (2005)
 Koning voor een dag (2008)
 De afvallige (2013)
 De ommegang (2018)

This writer's first three books take place before the Early Modern Period. Het oog van de basilisk'''s protagonist is Epiphanius Rusticus in the aftermath of the Roman Empire, while De valse dageraar is about Hroswith van Wikala in the Middle Ages, during the first millennium. The third novel De dwaas van Palmyra takes place in the 1st Century and describes the travels of the philosopher Apollonius of Tyana to India, as later seen through the eyes of his student, Damis.Het fluwelen labyrint takes place in Amsterdam during the 1980s. In Koning voor een dag, the protagonist  is the historic poet Hipponax, who lived in Ionia during the 6th Century. Hipponax was known for his sharp tongue and his coarse language. For this book, Van Aken used both original fragments from Hipponax as well as fictional Hipponax poems he created himself.

Jan van Aken's most recent novel is De Afvallige. It takes place during the time of Julian the Apostate, seen through the eyes of a group of boys belonging to a Christian Sect who ended up being involved in an assassination plot. This large-scale novel covers the period between 350 and 392 C.E..

Van Aken was previously published in the magazines Optima and Nieuw Wereldtijdschrift. His second novel was nominated for the Seghers Literatuurprijs. De afvallige'' came on the longlist for both the AKO and Libris literature prizes.

References 
 "Jan van Aken." Letterenfonds. N.p., n.d. Web. 09 Nov. 2015.

External links 
 Biography, works and texts at the Digitale Bibliotheek voor de Nederlandse Letteren (dbnl)

1961 births
Living people
Dutch male writers
People from Rijnwaarden